eWeek (Enterprise Newsweekly, stylized as eWEEK), formerly PCWeek, is a technology and business magazine. Previously owned by QuinStreet; Nashville, Tennessee marketing company TechnologyAdvice acquired eWeek in 2020.

The print edition ceased in 2012, "and eWeek became an all-digital publication"), at which time Quinstreet acquired the magazine from Internet company Ziff Davis, along with Baseline.com, ChannelInsider.com,  CIOInsight.com, and WebBuyersGuide.com.

eWeek was started under the name PCWeek on Feb. 28, 1984.  The magazine was called PCWeek until 2000, during which time it covered the rise of business computing in America; as eWeek, it increased its online presence and covers more kinds of worldwide technologies.

History

The magazine was started by Ziff Davis to cover the use of computers as business tools. 

Team members that started PCWeek included John Dodge, the first news editor; Lois Paul, the first features editor; and Sam Whitmore, the first reporter, who later went on to become editor-in-chief.

Chris Dobbrow, who "joined Ziff Davis Media ... as the associate publisher of PC Week, ... worked his way up the ladder at Ziff Davis, ... eventually becoming executive vice president." A short story in The New York Times about him said "He left in 2000 to join ... Last week, ... landed .. At eWeek. As the publisher. One step above the job he had 15 years ago."

At the time, many magazines at the time already covered business computing, such as Datamation and Computerworld.  There were also magazines dedicated to hobbyist machines, so it seemed there was no place for a weekly issue to fit in. The first few issues had only 22 pages of advertising, but then PCWeek began establishing itself.  By the end of the first year, the average number of advertising pages for the last month was 74.875.

Covering The New York Times
Twice eWeek had stories about The New York Times having its guard down:
 The Times' web site infected computers of on-line subscribers one weekend in 2009
 Midweek, even more visibly that above, the Times' website was down for over two hours, mid-day; the magazine used the word "nefarious."

An Atlantic magazine titled "How Not to Get Hacked Like the New York Times" explained how the first hack on the Times worked; the Times reported on a second (same month) hack against NYTimes.com with the headline "Times Site Is Disrupted in Attack by Hackers."

Buyers' guides
John Pallatto, a writer for PCWeek in its first year, produced a full buyer's guide on all DOS-compatible PCs on the market. 

Early promotional publications from PCWeek show them describing their key audience as "volume buyers", that is, people and companies that would buy PCs in bulk for business purposes.  With this the magazine was able to show big computer companies that advertising in an issue of PCWeek was the best possible way to get their product seen by the biggest and most important buyers.

Later success
PCWeek grew.  Scot Peterson became eWeek's main editor in 2005, having been, a Ziff-Davis employee 
since 1995, and previously held the title news editor.

People involved in between PCWeek's initial success and change to eWeek were David Strom, Sam Whitmore, Mike Edelhart, Gina Smith, Peter Coffee, Paul Bonner, current editor Chris Preimesberger and many others. 

Jim Louderback, a lab director at PCWeek as of 1991, describes how they were able to "get a product in on Wednesday, review it, and have it on the front page on Monday" and that "that was something we were the first to do". 

In 2012, eWeek and other Ziff Davis assets were acquired by the company QuinStreet, which also runs other tech-oriented publications.

Evolution
As the whole PC Industry evolved, PCWeek grew, and also developed a very active audience that spoke of their experiences, good and bad. 
Successor eWeek is even more oriented towards "Lab-based product evaluation," and covers a wide range tech topics.

Writers
Among former/current writers are:
 Jessica Davis
 Scott Ferguson, former Editor in Chief of eWeek, 2006 - 2012 (when eWeek stopped their print edition "and eWeek became an all-digital publication").
 Todd Weiss, Senior Writer ("all things mobile")

Influence
A famous part of PCWeek was the fictional gossip columnist by the name of "Spencer F. Katt".  The column would cover all sorts of rumors and gossip about the PC Industry, and the character of Spencer F. Katt became a famous icon of the entire world of computing.

PCWeek had influence on the PC Industry that it covered and the success of business PCs contributed to the success of PCWeek. John Pallatto characterizes the rise of PCs in 1985 as a "social phenomenon", and says that "the most sought-after status symbol on Wall Street in 1985... was the key to unlock the power switch on an IBM PC AT".

PCWeek was licensed in other countries, notably Australia, where it was first published by Australian Consolidated Press. Towards the end of the 1990s, the title shifted to a publishing partnership between Ziff-Davis and Australian Provincial Newspapers where its final Australian editor was Paul Zucker.

One story from PCWeek that is well known is their coverage of "the famous 1994 flaw in the numerical processor in Intel's Pentium chip".  The news they broke on Intel's processor, along with other research, caused Intel to actually pull back and fix their chips before offering new ones.  

Current editor in chief Chris Preimesberger, who joined eWEEK in 2005 as a free-lancer, now runs a staff consisting of mostly free-lancers, many of whom have worked full time for eWEEK in the past and at other IT publications. The readership has been loyal through the years and now consists mostly of veteran IT professionals, company executives, software developers, investors and other people interested in the ebb and flow of the IT business and trends in products and services.

Training
After 14 years at PC week, Sam Whitmore started his own firm (Media Survey). The latter, after over 2 decades, began a fellowship to train future reporters.

References

External links
 

Biweekly magazines published in the United States
Business magazines published in the United States
Computer magazines published in the United States
Defunct computer magazines published in the United States
Magazines established in 1983
Magazines disestablished in 2012
Magazines published in Boston
Magazines published in California
Online magazines published in the United States
Online magazines with defunct print editions